Route 2 is a  state highway in Hartford and New London counties in Connecticut. It is a primary state route, with a limited-access freeway section connecting Hartford to Norwich and following surface roads to Stonington. The entire freeway section of Route 2 is also known as the Veterans of Foreign Wars Memorial Highway.

Route description

Route 2 begins as a continuation of State Street (just east of Columbus Blvd) near Interstate 91 in downtown Hartford. It starts out heading east toward East Hartford. Route 2 then crosses the Connecticut River on the Founders Bridge and has a partial interchange with I-91 at the crossing. Immediately after crossing into East Hartford, there is a complex interchange with Interstate 84. Immediately after this interchange, Route 2 heads southeast in the direction of Glastonbury. There is a partial interchange with Route 15 about  further. After East Hartford, Route 2 enters Glastonbury. At the East Hartford-Glastonbury town line, there is a full trumpet interchange with Route 3. About  after this interchange, there is a partial interchange with Route 17. From Glastonbury, Route 2 passes into Marlborough. It continues into Colchester. In Colchester, Route 2 has a partial interchange with Route 11. After this interchange, Route 2 curves and heads east toward Norwich. Once Route 2 leaves Colchester, it passes through the towns of Lebanon and Bozrah. After Bozrah, Route 2 enters Norwich. Just after entering Norwich, Route 32 joins Route 2. Then, about  down Route 2, there is a partial cloverleaf interchange with Interstate 395. About  further east from the I-395 interchange, the limited-access highway section of Route 2 ends at a four-way at-grade intersection with Town Street, Harland Road (Route 169), and Washington Street (Route 32/Route 2). Route 2 continues southeast from Norwich into Preston, and then into Ledyard. Just after entering Ledyard, Route 2 passes by the Mashantucket Pequot Reservation and then the Foxwoods Resort Casino. After passing through Ledyard, Route 2 continues into North Stonington. There is a roundabout with Route 184 and a partial interchange with Interstate 95 here. After leaving North Stonington, Route 2 heads into Stonington. Here, Route 2 is reduced to a minor arterial road. It has an interchange with Route 78 (Westerly Bypass) and terminates about  later at the junction with US 1 in the Pawcatuck section of town just west of the Rhode Island state line.

Several Connecticut limited-access highways terminate at Route 2. Route 3 ends at Route 2 near the East Hartford-Glastonbury town line, Route 17 ends at Route 2 in Glastonbury, and Route 11 ends at Route 2 in Colchester. Route 78 also ends at Route 2, in Stonington. It is unusual that Route 78 intersects Route 2 where it is not a limited-access highway.

History
Two early toll roads, the Hartford and New London Turnpike and the Colchester and Norwich Turnpike, followed the alignment of current Route 2 in the 1800s. In 1922, The New England Interstate system incorporated the future Route 2 alignment as Route 17. Upon the discontinuation of the New England routes in the 1932 state highway renumbering, the eastern half of old New England Route 17 was renumbered to Route 2. The western half of old New England Route 17 eventually formed part of U.S. Route 44.

Limited-access highway construction along the Route 2 alignment started in the 1950s and continued through the 1960s and early 1970s. The oldest limited-access highway segment, between exits 5A and 7, opened in 1952; the latest segment, between exits 20 and 22, opened in 1971. The state still maintains some segments of the older, access highway alignment, but does not sign these segments as state routes. The state remanded the remaining access highway segments to town jurisdiction.

Major intersections
Exit numbers are currently sequential, but are scheduled to be converted to mile-based numbering starting in 2023.

See also

 List of state highways in Connecticut
 List of highways numbered 2

References

External links

Freeways in the United States
002
Transportation in Hartford County, Connecticut
Transportation in New London County, Connecticut
U.S. Route 44